Mohammad Shah Fazli is a politician from Afghanistan who served as Vice President of Afghanistan and President of Supreme Court of Afghanistan.

References 

Afghan politicians
Vice presidents of Afghanistan